The Süleymaniye Mosque is an Ottoman imperial mosque located on the Third Hill of Istanbul, Turkey. The mosque was commissioned by Suleiman the Magnificent and designed by the imperial architect Mimar Sinan. An inscription specifies the foundation date as 1550 and the inauguration date as 1557. Behind the qibla wall of the mosque is an enclosure containing the separate octagonal mausoleums of Suleiman the Magnificent and his wife Hurrem Sultan (Roxelana). For 462 years, the Süleymaniye Mosque was the largest mosque in the city, until it was surpassed by the Çamlıca Mosque in 2019. The Süleymaniye Mosque is one of the best-known sights of Istanbul, and from its location on the Third Hill, it commands an extensive view of the city around the Golden Horn.

History

Sultan Suleyman the Magnificent chose the architect Mimar Sinan to create a mosque in memory of his son Şehzade (Crown Prince) Mehmed. Suleyman was so impressed with the ensuing Şehzade Mosque (Şehzade Cami) that he asked Sinan to design a mosque for himself too. This mosque would represent the pre-eminence of the Ottoman Empire.  In designing the Süleymaniye Mosque, Sinan took inspiration from the Hagia Sophia and the Bayezid II Mosque.  The mosque was built on the site of the old palace (Eski Saray) of Topkapi which was still in use at the time and had to be demolished. 

The Arabic inscription above the north portal of the mosque is carved in Thuluth script on three marble panels. It gives a foundation date of 1550 and an inauguration date of 1557. In reality the planning of the mosque began before 1550 and parts of the complex were not completed until after 1557. 

The design of the Süleymaniye played on Süleyman's self-conscious representation of himself as a 'second Solomon.'  It referenced the Dome of the Rock, which was built on the site of the Temple of Solomon in Jerusalem, as well as Justinian's boast upon the completion of the Hagia Sophia: "Solomon, I have surpassed thee!" The Süleymaniye asserted Süleyman's historical importance although it was smaller in size than Hagia Sophia.

The Süleymaniye was damaged in the great fire of 1660 and was restored by Sultan Mehmed IV. Part of the dome collapsed during the earthquake of 1766. Subsequent repairs damaged what was left of Sinan's original decoration (recent cleaning has shown that he experimented with blue, before making red the dominant colour of the dome).

During World War I the courtyard was used as a weapons depot, and when some of the ammunition ignited, the mosque suffered another fire. Not until 1956 was it fully restored again. The mosque was restored again between 2007 and 2010. Parts of the surrounding complex continued to be restored in the decade following.

Architecture

Exterior

Like the other imperial mosques in Istanbul, the entrance to the mosque is preceded by a forecourt with a central fountain. The courtyard is of exceptional grandeur with a colonnaded peristyle with columns of marble, granite and porphyry. The northwest facade of the mosque is decorated with rectangular Iznik tile window lunettes. It was the first building in which the Iznik tiles included the brightly coloured tomato red clay under the glaze.

Four minarets occupy the four corners of the courtyard. The two taller ones have three galleries (serifes) and rise to a high of  without their lead caps and  including the caps. Four minarets were added to mosques endowed by a sultan (princes and princesses could construct two minarets; others only one). The minarets have a total of 10 galleries, which is said to reflect the fact that Suleiman I was the 10th Ottoman sultan.

When it was built, it was the highest dome in the Ottoman Empire, when measured from sea level, although it was still lower from its base and smaller in diameter than that of Hagia Sophia.

Interior

The dome is flanked by semi-domes, and to the north and south there are arches with tympana-filled windows, supported by enormous porphyry monoliths. Sinan embarked on a radical architectural innovation to mask the huge north–south buttresses needed to support these central piers - he incorporated the buttresses into the walls of the building, with half projecting inwards and half projecting outwards, and then hid the projections by building colonnaded galleries. There is a single gallery inside the structure, and a two-story gallery outside.

The interior decoration is restrained, with stained-glass windows restricted to the qibla wall. Iznik tile revetments are only used around the mihrab. The repeating rectangular tiles have a stencil-like floral pattern on a white ground. The flowers are mainly blue with turquoise, red and black but green is not used. On either side of the mihrab are large Iznik-tile calligraphic roundels with text from the Al-Fatiha surah of the Quran (1:1–7). The white marble mihrab and mimbar are simple in design, and the woodwork is restrained, with simple designs in ivory and mother of pearl.

Mausoleums

In the walled enclosure behind the qibla wall of the mosque are the separate mausoleums (türbe) of Sultan Suleiman I and his wife Hurrem Sultan (Roxelana). 

The large octagonal mausoleum of Suleiman the Magnificent bears the date of 1566, the year of his death, but it was probably not completed until the following year. The mausoleum is surrounded by a peristyle with a projecting roof supported by 24 columns; the entrance faces towards the east rather than the usual north. Beneath the portico on either side of the entrance are Iznik tiled panels. These are the earliest known tiles decorated with the bright emerald green colour that would become a common feature of Iznik ceramics. The interior has a false dome supported on eight columns within the outer shell. There are 14 windows at ground level and an additional 24 windows with stained glass set in the tympana under the arches. The walls and pendentives are covered with polychrome Iznik tiles. Above the windows runs a band of inscriptive tiled panels. The text quotes the Throne verse and the following two verses from the Quran (2:255-58). In addition to the tomb of Suleiman the Magnificent, the mausoleum houses the tomb of his daughter Mihrimah Sultan and those of two later sultans: Suleiman II (ruled 1687–1691) and Ahmed II (ruled 1691–1695).

Hurrem Sultan's octagonal mausoleum is dated 1558, the year of her death. The 16-sided interior is decorated with Iznik tiles. The seven rectangular windows are surmounted by tiled lunettes and epigraphic panels. Between the windows are eight mihrab-like hooded niches. The ceiling is now whitewashed but was probably once painted in bright colours.

There is also a large graveyard containing the tombs of notable figures including Gazi Osman Paşa and Mimar Kemaleddin.

Complex

As with other imperial mosques in Istanbul, the Süleymaniye Mosque was designed as a külliye, or complex, with adjacent structures to service both religious and cultural needs. The mosque incorporates the everyday needs for civilisation such as prayer, education, health and much more.  The original complex consisted of the mosque itself, a hospital (darüşşifa), primary school (mekteb), public baths (hamam), a caravanserai, four Qur'an schools (medrese), a specialized school for the learning of hadith, a medical college and a public kitchen (imaret) which served food to the poor. Many of these structures are still in existence, and the former imaret is now a noted restaurant. The former hospital is now a printing factory owned by the Turkish Army.

Just outside the complex walls, to the north is the tomb of architect Sinan. It was completely restored in 1922.

Inscriptions 
Religious inscriptions in parts of the mosque demonstrate its stature as a place of sacredness. Quranic messages can be found incorporated throughout the building. For example, the side entrance of the mosque has an inscription reading, "Peace be unto thee! Thou art good, so enter ye to dwell therein" (39:73) On the Qibla wall, the stained-glass windows display the names of God (Allah), the Prophet Muhammad, and the caliphs. They are there to represent Allah as the lawmaker, Muhammad as the preacher, and the four caliphs as the four pillars. of Islam

Gallery

Buried here
 Suleiman I (1494–1566)
 Hürrem Sultan (c. 1502–1558), Suleiman's wife
 Mihrimah Sultan (c. 1522–1578) Suleiman and Hürrem's daughter
 Ahmed II (1642/43–1695)
 Rabia Sultan (d. 1712) Ahmed's consort
 Asiye Sultan (1694–1695), Ahmed and Rabia's daughter
 Suleiman II (1642–1691)
 Aşub Sultan (d. 1690) Suleiman's mother

See also

List of Friday mosques designed by Mimar Sinan
 Suleymaniye hamam
 List of mosques in Istanbul
 List of tallest structures built before the 20th century

References

 Gabr, Aly (2001). "Rediscovery: Mimar Sinan, Suleyman the Magnificent & the Suleymaniye". In Medina Issue Seventeen: Architecture, Interiors & Fine Arts. British Virgin Islands: Medina Magazine.
 Ching, Francis (2017). A Global History of Architecture. John Wiley & Sons, Incorporated. p. 533.
 Migeon, Gaston (2009). Art of Islam. Parkstone International. pp.lxxii.
 Kuban, Dogan (1987). "Süleymaniye and Sixteenth-century Istanbul". Journal of the Islamic Environmental Design Research Centre 1-2: 4 – via Archnet.org.
 Necipoglu, Gulru (1985). "The Süleymaniye Complex in Istanbul: An Interpretation". In Muqarnas III: An Annual on Islamic Art and Architecture: 110 – via Archnet.org.

Sources

Further reading

External links

 Süleymaniye Külliyesi, Archnet
 Süleymaniye Mosque ve Mimar Sinan 
  Suleymaniye Mosque Virtual Walking Tour, Saudi Aramco World.
 Photographs by Dick Osseman

Mimar Sinan buildings
Ottoman mosques in Istanbul
Landmarks in Turkey
Fatih
Suleiman the Magnificent
Madrasas in Turkey
1558 establishments in the Ottoman Empire
16th-century mosques
Mosque buildings with domes
Constantinople
Historic preservation in Turkey
Mosques completed in 1558
16th-century madrasas